Audrey Tiffany Chin (born October 3, 1967) is an American figure skating coach and former competitor. She is a two-time World bronze medalist (1985–1986), a two-time Skate America champion (1983, 1986), and the 1985 U.S. national champion.

Personal life 
Chin was born on October 3, 1967, in Oakland, California. She grew up in San Diego, California. She graduated with a BA in English from University of California, Los Angeles. Her son, Kyle Kan, was born in February 2004.

Career

Early career 
Chin won the 1981 World Junior Championships, held in December 1980 in London, Ontario, Canada.

Originally trained by Mabel Fairbanks as a young child, Chin switched to Janet Champion under the recommendation of Fairbanks. Her mother, Marjorie, later fired Champion and had her daughter train with Frank Carroll, who led Chin to her World Junior title. However, Marjorie had some serious disagreements with Carroll which led Carroll to resign. Chin then worked with John Nicks.

1983–1984 season 
At the 1984 U.S. Championships, she placed fourth in the compulsory figures but won both the short and long programs. Finishing second to Rosalynn Sumners, she was awarded the silver medal and was named in the U.S. team to the 1984 Winter Olympic in Sarajevo. At the Olympics, Chin placed 12th in the compulsory figures but climbed to fourth overall after placing second in the short program and third in the free skate. She missed the World Championships due to injury.

1984–1985 season 

Chin began the next Olympic quadrennium with silver at the 1984 Skate Canada International, where she finished second to Japan's Midori Ito. Chin experienced a decline in consistency and technical level from the previous season; she relied almost exclusively on the triple toe and did not even attempt a triple flip or land a successful triple salchow all season. Despite a fall in the short program and a conservative long program, she finished first in all three phases of the competition at the 1985 U.S. Championships. Her U.S. national title was the first singles' title for an Asian-American or anyone of non-European descent.

At the 1985 World Championships, Chin was in a strong position to contend for the title after placing second in both the compulsory figures and the short program. However, in her free skate, she popped her triple Salchow into a single and fell on her final double axel, finishing third in the free program and third overall behind Katarina Witt and Kira Ivanova. As had been the case all season, the toe loop was the only triple she executed successfully. In the summer of 1985, her mother, Marjorie, pulled her off the ice for three months due to her muscle imbalance.

After a growth spurt and a recurring injury (a muscle imbalance affecting her legs, arms, and hips) that caused her to lose many of her triple jumps, Chin left Nicks in 1985 and went on to train with Don Laws.

1985–1986 season 
After undergoing a course of traditional medicine and chiropractic treatments, Chin began to relearn her skating technique under a new coach, Don Laws. She entered the 1986 U.S. Championships as an underdog and finished third overall behind Debi Thomas and Caryn Kadavy. Chin qualified for the World Championships in Geneva, where she placed fourth in the compulsories and tied for second in the short program to enter the long program in third place. With Witt defeating Thomas in the long program, Chin as the last skater was in position to win the gold by winning the free skate, or to aid Witt in passing Thomas for the gold should she have split them in the long program. A fourth-place finish in the long program (behind Witt, Thomas, and Elizabeth Manley) with one clean triple jump, one other triple with a slight touch down, several double axels, and good presentation scores, was enough to give her the bronze medal overall behind Thomas and Witt.

1986–1987 season 
In the fall of 1986, Chin returned to Nicks as her coach. She switched again to Carroll prior to the 1987 U.S. Championships. At that event she was in third place after the compulsory figures and short program, but was unable to complete a triple jump or clean double axel in her long program and dropped to fourth overall, failing to qualify for the World Championships for the first time since her U.S. senior national debut in 1982. Needing only a 4th-place finish in the long program after Kadvavy's poor short program, Chin's long program was narrowly beaten by a young Tonya Harding, dropping Chin behind Kadavy and off the world team.

Sensing only slim chances of making the Olympic team against the trifecta of Thomas, Kadavy, and Trenary, Chin retired from Olympic-eligible skating in the fall of 1987.

Professional and coaching career 
Chin toured professionally and competed occasionally in professional events, finishing fourth at the 1987 Nutrasweet World Professional Figure Skating Championships and second at the 1990 U.S. Open behind Elizabeth Manley.
 
Chin remained involved in figure skating by becoming a coach. Her former students include Beatrisa Liang and Hounsh Munshi. Liang left Chin in 2004 when Chin took some time off from coaching because she was expecting a child. Chin became a technical specialist in 2006, receiving national status a year later.

On May 3, 2009, Chin was honored by the Los Angeles Chinese Historical Society of Southern California in "Celebrating Chinese Americans in Sports".

In 2010, Chin became the coach of Australia's Kailani Craine, who would qualify a spot at the 2018 Winter Olympics and 2022 Winter Olympics.

Later years
Chin was inducted into the United States Figure Skating Hall of Fame in January, 2022.

Competitive highlights

References

External links

1967 births
American female single skaters
American figure skating coaches
Olympic figure skaters of the United States
Figure skaters at the 1984 Winter Olympics
Living people
Sportspeople from San Diego
University of California, Los Angeles alumni
American sportspeople of Chinese descent
World Figure Skating Championships medalists
World Junior Figure Skating Championships medalists
American sportswomen of Chinese descent
Female sports coaches
People from Oakland, California
21st-century American women